Domingo Manrique (born 24 February 1962) is a Spanish sailor, world champion and Olympic champion.

Manrique was born in Las Palmas de Gran Canaria.  He won a gold medal at the 1992 Summer Olympics in Barcelona (Flying Dutchman).

References

1962 births
Living people
Olympic gold medalists for Spain
Olympic medalists in sailing
Olympic sailors of Spain
Real Club Náutico de Gran Canaria sailors
Sailors at the 1988 Summer Olympics – Soling
Sailors at the 1992 Summer Olympics – Flying Dutchman
Sailors at the 1996 Summer Olympics – Soling
Sailors at the 2000 Summer Olympics – Soling
Snipe class sailors
Spanish male sailors (sport)
Sportspeople from Las Palmas
Soling class world champions
Medalists at the 1992 Summer Olympics
20th-century Spanish people